Bhutan and the United States have no formal diplomatic relations, but relations between the two nations are viewed as "friendly and close", due to shared values between the two countries. The increasingly close relationship between India and the U.S. has also helped to improve U.S.–Bhutanese relations. 

Bhutan is represented in the U.S. through its permanent mission to the United Nations. The United States is represented through the American embassy in New Delhi, India. Bhutan is one of two countries in Asia to have never hosted an American embassy with the other being North Korea.

History

In 2008, the U.S. offered to resettle 60,000 of the 107,000 Bhutanese refugees of Nepalese origin living in seven U.N. refugee camps in southeastern Nepal.

In 2011, former Prime Minister of Bhutan Jigme Thinley stated, "If we can have all kinds of interactions, relations and cooperation with the US, as with Germany and France, with which we have no diplomatic relations, what is the purpose (of such relations with Washington)?" On April 7, former U.S. Ambassador to India Tim Roemer met with Thinley to discuss ways to further strengthen ties between both countries. Thinley also stated that he had hosted many State Department officials, Congressmen, and Senators for informal talks since he became head of the government in April 2008 after the country’s first fully democratic elections.

On January 11, 2015, then-U.S. Secretary of State John Kerry met with Bhutanese Prime Minister Tshering Tobgay at the seventh Vibrant Gujarat summit marking the first time senior leaders from both countries met with one another. However, there were no plans to establish diplomatic relations. Prior to Secretary Kerry's meeting, the highest-ranking State Department official to meet with Bhutan's leaders was the Undersecretary and in the past American officials have met with the fourth King, Jigme Singye Wangchuck, and fifth King of Bhutan, Jigme Khesar Namgyel Wangchuck.

See also

 Foreign relations of Bhutan
 Foreign relations of the United States
 Bhutanese refugees
 Bhutanese Americans
 Bhutan–India relations
 India–United States relations

References

External links

 U.S. Relations With Bhutan State Department Fact Sheet

 
United States
Bilateral relations of the United States